Pyar Ke Sadqay is a 2020 Pakistani drama television series premiered on 23 January 2020 on Hum TV. It is directed by Farooq Rind, written by Zanjabeel Asim Shah and produced by Momina Duraid under MD Productions. It has Yumna Zaidi and Bilal Abbas in leads while Yashma Gill, Omair Rana and Atiqa Odho in supporting roles.
The series received critical acclaim due to Rind's direction and Zaidi's performance as Mahjabeen. Pyar Ke Sadqay won the most awards in Lux Style Awards 2021 including Best Actor Critics for Khan and Best Actress Critics and Best Actress Popular both for Zaidi.

Plot 

"Pyar Ke Sadqay" is the story of Abdullah (Bilal Abbas) and Mahjabeen (Yumna Zaidi), who are social misfits. Mahjabeen's character is that of an ingénue. Mahjabeen is a naïve, quirky, clumsy, carefree, overtalkative, and mischievous young woman who has failed the tenth-grade multiple times. She is very innocent and fails to pick up on specific social cues. Presumably, she has a lower-middle-class family background. Abdullah is a shy, nerdy, soft-spoken, and socially awkward/out-of-place university student gifted in mathematics. He comes from an affluent upbringing and has been verbally abused by his stepfather, Sarwar (Omair Rana). Both protagonists are daydreamers with different aspirations; Mahjabeen fantasises about escaping from her studies and getting married one day, while Abdullah dreams about a relationship with his crush and classmate, Shanzey (Yashma Gill).

Mahjabeen and Abdullah know each other through her father, Munshi Jee, who works for Abdullah's family and business. Mahjabeen teases Abdullah occasionally, and they are acquaintances at the beginning of the series. Early in the series, Sarwar becomes smitten with Mahjabeen and plots to pursue her romantically. However, his desire to marry Mahjabeen is rejected by Munshi Jee as she is far too innocent and young to be married to someone as cunning and old as Sarwar. After both protagonists get rejected by their interests (with Mahjabeen's fiancé eloping with her best friend on her wedding day and Abdullah's crush rejecting his proposal), Abdullah marries Mahjabeen. He does this out of pity. This angers Sarwar, and he secretly plots to ruin the gullible Abdullah's relationship with the ever-so innocent Mahjabeen. He continuously insults Mahjabeen and tells Abdullah that she is unworthy of him. Although he listens to and believes his stepfather, in the beginning, he begins to like the small things that make her a "Middle class" wife.

As this happens, Shanzey, Abdullah's crush, gets married to the man she wanted to marry, a wealthy and high-class businessman. However, she finds him very stubborn and selfish. She leaves him early in their marriage as she realises he is not the man she wants to spend the rest of her life with. At first, her father is hesitant to let her come home and stay; however, once he sees him abuse his daughter, he kicks him out and supports his daughter as she divorces him. Eventually, Shanzey realises she wants to marry someone like Abdullah, so she begins to pursue him with the guidance and support of Sarwar, who wants Mahjabeen to himself.

The plot twists, and Sarwar tries to assault Mahjabeen. Mahjabeen tells Abdullah about Sarwar, who says his father could never do Such a thing. He sends her back home on the account of his father's insult. Munshi Jee gets arrested on the order of Sarwar, has a heart attack and dies after asking Vashma, Abdullah's younger sister, to take care of Mahjabeen as she is very innocent. Unlike her brother Abdullah, Vashem is a confident girl as she grew up with her aunt, Lalarukh, instead of lurking with Sarwar. Abdullah proceeds to get engaged to Shanzey after she attempts suicide. As he talks to his fiancé about their future, he realises she will be a very different wife compared to Mahjabeen. Shanzey says she will not do any of the "middle class" wife things Mahjabeen used to do for him, which leaves Abdullah missing his wife. Shanzey and Sarwar pressure Abdullah to divorce Mahjabeen; however, his sister and aunt tell him not to. Abdullah's mother, Mansura, is adamant that her husband loves her and refuses to believe Vashma when she tells her what he did to Mahjabeen. However, she eventually gets suspicious about him, so she tells Abdullah not to divorce his wife. Sarwar threatens Mahjabeen and her mother, but she cuts the call on his end. Vashem takes Mahjabeen to the hospital, where she is revealed to be pregnant. Vashem explains to her mom that Munshi Ji was innocent and was tied to a plan plotted by Sarwar. Mansura then tells her son to take over their company. She leaves Sarwar. Abdullah realises Mehjabeen is his true love and ends his engagement with Shanzey.

The serial ends with Abdullah bringing Mehjabeen home, Sarwar ends up in the jail, and the last scene is of Mahjabeen and Abdullah quarrelling.

Cast 

 Yumna Zaidi as Mahjabeen: the ingénue female protagonist and Abdullah’s eventual wife 
 Bilal Abbas as Abdullah Shahbaz: male protagonist and Mahjabeen’s eventual husband 
 Omair Rana as Sarwar: antagonist, Abdullah’s abusive stepfather who plots to pursue Mahjabeen
 Atiqa Odho as Mansura : Abdullah's mother.
 Yashma Gill as Shanzey Meer: Abdullah’s classmate and crush at the beginning of the series
 Malik Raza as Munshi Jee: Mahjabeen’s father, works for Abdullah’s family/family business 
 Salma Hassan as Seema: Mahjabeen's mother, Munshi Jee's wife. 
 Gul-e-Rana as Sarwar's mother: supporting antagonist. 
 Shermeen Ali as Lalarukh “Pho,” Abdullah and Washma’s Phupho (paternal aunt)
 Srha Asghar as Vashma: Abdullah's younger sister.
 Khalid Anam as Meer: Shanzey’s father
 Khalid Malik as “Dr.” Hammad: briefly engaged to Mahjabeen and impersonates a doctor
 Ahsan Mohsin Akram as Ehsaan: Washma's classmate and lover

Soundtrack

Pyar Ke Sadqay’s OST (titled after the series) was composed and performed by Pakistani singer Ahmed Jahanzaib. Mahnoor Khan also provided vocals for the song. The OST has drawn heavy comparisons to the popular Sindhi song, Rahat Milay Thi Dard Mein, Man Piyar Tan Sadqay, in terms of its lyrics, melody, harmonies, and overall composition. The song "Rahat Milay Thi Dard Mein" was originally performed by the Pakistani Sindhi folk/playback singer, Ustad Muhammad Yousuf for the 1968 Pakistani Sindhi-language film, Shehro Feroz.

Reception 
Pyar Ke Sadqay created critical hype before its premier and received rave reviews throughout its broadcast due to its characters and Rind's direction. Zaidi's performance as Mahjabeen and Khan's performance as Abdullah was highly praised. A reviewer from DAWN Images criticised the narrative onwards the 20th episodes due to ordinary storyline.

Awards and nominations

References

External links
 Official website

2020 Pakistani television series debuts
Pakistani television series
Romantic comedy television series
Urdu-language television shows
Hum TV
Hum TV original programming
MD Productions